Diep River (Afrikaans Dieprivier), drains the area between the Kasteel Mountain (north of Malmesbury) and the northern slopes of the Durbanville Hills, in the Western Cape, a province of South Africa.

Rivers of the Western Cape